Saint-Germain-en-Laye–Grande-Ceinture is railway station in Saint-Germain-en-Laye, France. Its creation was decided on 11 March 1875 and opened in 1877. The station was built as a passenger stop on the Grande Ceinture but the line soon lost its passenger traffic only to become a goods station. The station recently reopened on 29 November 2004 and is the terminus of a small line to Noisy-le-Roi. From this station, one can go to the Gare St-Lazare by taking the Grande Ceinture Ouest to St.Nom-la-Bretèche, where one changes platforms to get a train to Paris. In July 2022, the T13 tram stops at this station indicated on the map as "Lisière Péreire", replacing the old Transilien L line.

External links
 

Railway stations in Yvelines
Railway stations in France opened in 1877